Salomon Ehrmann (December 19, 1854 - October 24, 1926) was a Jewish-Austrian dermatologist and histologist born in the village of Ostrovec, today part of the Czech Republic. He was an important member of the so-called Vienna School of Dermatology, a group founded by Ferdinand von Hebra (1816–1888).

Ehrmann was a pupil of histopathologist Carl Wedl (1815–1891) at the University of Vienna. He later became director of the dermatological department at Vienna General Hospital. He specialized in the field of syphilology, and is remembered for his research involving the parasite Spirochaetae pallida (the causative agent of syphilis), and its spread throughout the human body.

In 1895 he described acne keloidalis, which he referred to as folliculitis nuchae sclerotisans. Among his written works was a comparative diagnostic atlas of skin diseases called Vergleichend-diagnostischer Atlas der Hautkrankheiten und der Syphilide. Other published works by Ehrmann include:
 Kompendium der speziellen Histopathologie der Haut (with Johannes Fick), 1905
 Uber die Beziehungen der Spirochaeta pallida zu den Lymph- und Blutbahnen
 Die Phagocytose und die Degenerationsformen der Spirochaete pallida im Primäraffekt und Lymphstrang, 1906
 Beziehungen der ekzematösen Erkrankungen zu inneren Leiden, 1924.

References 
 AEIOU; Short Biography

External links 
 The Evolution of Dermatology- The American Experience by Jag Bhagwan
 Digitized periodical (B41.1) for the B'nai B'rith humanitarian association, edited by Salomon Ehrmann

1854 births
1926 deaths
People from Písek District
People from the Kingdom of Bohemia
Czech Jews
Austro-Hungarian Jews
Austrian histologists
Austrian dermatologists
Czech dermatologists